John Watson ( 1547–1554), from Newcastle-upon-Tyne, was an English politician.

Family
Watson was the son of John Watson of Newcastle-upon-Tyne. There is no record of a marriage or children; however, his life is obscure, and it is possible that it was not the same John Watson who served for Newcastle-upon-Tyne, Morpeth and Berwick-upon-Tweed.

Education
Watson was educated at Lincoln's Inn, London.

Career
He was a Member (MP) of the Parliament of England for Berwick-upon-Tweed in 1547, Morpeth in October 1553, and Newcastle-upon-Tyne in November 1554.

References

Year of birth missing
Year of death missing
Politicians from Newcastle upon Tyne
Members of Lincoln's Inn
English MPs 1547–1552
English MPs 1553 (Mary I)
English MPs 1554–1555